Justin Morris Bibb (born April 26, 1987) is an American politician and former non-profit leader serving as the 58th mayor of Cleveland, Ohio since January 2022. Prior to serving as mayor, Bibb was the Co-Chair of Teach for America – Ohio, and a board member for the Greater Cleveland Regional Transit Authority, Destination Cleveland, and LAND Studio.

On January 12, 2021, Bibb announced his candidacy in the 2021 Cleveland mayoral election. In the crowded eight candidate primary, Bibb came in first with 27% of the vote in the September 14th primary, advancing him to the general election alongside the President of Cleveland City Council, Kevin J. Kelley. On November 2, 2021, Bibb won the city's mayoral election, defeating Kelley with a decisive 62% of the vote, becoming Cleveland's 4th African American mayor, and its 2nd youngest.

Early life and education

Bibb was born in Cleveland and grew up in the Mount Pleasant neighborhood on the southeast side. He graduated from Trinity High School in the suburb of Garfield Heights and received early acceptance to American University in Washington, D.C. where he earned a B.A in Urban Studies. During his undergraduate degree, he was awarded a scholarship to study abroad at the London School of Economics where he completed The General Course program in Social Policy and Economics. In 2014, he returned to Cleveland and attended Case Western Reserve University School of Law and Weatherhead School of Management and received his JD and MBA.

Career

Bibb interned for Senator Barack Obama in 2007 and began working in local government in 2011 as Special Assistant for Education & Economic Development for Cuyahoga County, where he established the Cuyahoga County Public Policy Fellowship Program. Bibb spent two years working in corporate strategy for Knowledge Generation Bureau before taking senior positions at Gallup (company), becoming the Head of Global Cities Practice in 2015. After working in New York and Washington, D.C, he returned to Cleveland to serve as Vice President at KeyBank in 2019. He currently serves as the Chief Strategy Officer at Urbanova, a start-up focused on smart cities.

Bibb is a nonprofit leader and co-founded Hack Cleveland in 2014 following the shooting of Tamir Rice to advocate for criminal justice reform using civic technology. Most recently, he founded Cleveland Can't Wait, which is focused on advancing racial equity and economic opportunity in Cleveland's underserved neighborhoods.

Mayor of Cleveland

Election

2021

Bibb formally announced his candidacy for mayor of Cleveland in early 2021, promising to bring new leadership and a sense of urgency to Cleveland's problems. As the son of a police officer and firefighter, he has pledged to make public safety his number one priority. Three months after launching his committee, Bibb's campaign announced that it had raised $180,000, a significant sum for a first-time candidate and far more than Frank Jackson and others raised in the 2017 primaries. Ryan Puente, former Executive Director, Cuyahoga County, served as Bibb's Campaign Manager.

Bibb had a strong showing at the Cleveland Mayoral Candidates Forum on Criminal Justice held on April 28, 2021. 3,000 valid petition signatures are required to make the ballot for the 2021 Cleveland mayoral election, known as a relatively high hurdle. Bibb filed his petition to run for Cleveland Mayor at the Cuyahoga County Board of Elections on June 10, 2021. Bibb was announced as one of seven candidates to make the ballot on June 16, 2021.

On August 8, 2021, Bibb was endorsed by the editorial board of cleveland.com and The Plain Dealer, Cleveland's major newspaper. On August 18, 2021, Bibb was then endorsed by two former Cleveland mayors, Michael R. White and Jane Campbell.

On September 14, 2021, Bibb placed first in the mayoral primary, advancing him to the November 2 general election alongside City Council President Kevin Kelley. On November 2, 2021, Bibb defeated Kelley in the general election, receiving 62.86 percent of the vote.

Tenure

On January 3, 2022, Bibb was sworn in as the 58th Mayor of Cleveland. He has developed a cabinet that "looks like the city." He has appointed African Americans, Latino Americans, Italian Americans, Irish Americans, and representatives of many other ethnic groups in Cleveland, as well as LGBTQ individuals.

On January 31, 2022, at a press conference at Tower City Center, Bibb announced that for the NBA All-Star Game, hosted in Cleveland that year, all in attendance would have to be vaccinated against COVID-19.

Bibb has laid out some of his biggest initiatives as Mayor, including COVID-19 recovery, safety, crime, economy, equity, and to continue the momentum happening in Cleveland.

On February 22, 2022, Bibb endorsed Rep. Shontel Brown (D) in her effort to win re-election for Ohio's 11th District, a district that represents most of Cleveland's Downtown and East side. The western parts of Cleveland are represented by Rep. Marcy Kaptur (D), who represents Ohio's 9th District.

On August 13, 2022, Bibb officially announced this day as Machine Gun Kelly Day in Cleveland, Ohio.

Family

Bibb's late father, Donald Bibb, was one of the first African American first responders in the streetcar suburb of Cleveland Heights, serving for over 30 years. Donald was a firefighter for the Cleveland Heights Fire Dept. and also served as a police officer for the Cleveland Heights Police Dept., Cuyahoga Community College and the Cleveland Clinic. His mother, Charlene Nichols, is a social worker for seniors.

Bibb's cousin Leon Bibb is an American news anchor and commentator for WKYC in Cleveland. Bibb is also a member of Alpha Phi Alpha.

References

External links
 Office of the Mayor of Cleveland official website
 

1987 births
Living people
21st-century African-American politicians
21st-century American politicians
African-American people in Ohio politics
American University alumni
Case Western Reserve University alumni
Mayors of Cleveland
Ohio Democrats
African-American mayors in Ohio